The Blackwater Valley Path follows the River Blackwater from its source in the Rowhill Nature Reserve  in  Aldershot to just beyond the point where it joins the River Whitewater near Swallowfield to become the Broadwater. It is looked after by the Blackwater Valley Countryside Partnership. 

The Surrey Heath section includes informal parks on reclaimed land at Blackwater Park and Watchmoor.

See also
Recreational walks in Hampshire
Long-distance footpaths in the UK

References

External links
Blackwater Valley Countryside
Blackwater Valley map with links
Surrey Heath borough council
Blackwater Valley runners - Running club that runs the BlackWater Valley path 

Footpaths in Hampshire
Footpaths in Surrey
Surrey Heath
Long-distance footpaths in England